The chairman of the Standing Committee of the National People's Congress is the presiding officer of the Standing Committee of the National People's Congress (NPCSC), which is the permanent body of the National People's Congress (NPC), the national legislature of China.

Officially, the chairman is nominated by the Presidium of the NPC during a session and approved by the delegations of the NPC, though in reality is chosen within the ruling Chinese Communist Party (CCP). The chairman presides over the work of the NPCSC and convenes and presides over its meetings. The chairman is assisted by the vice chairpersons and secretary-general of the NPCSC, who together makeup the Council of Chairpersons. A vice chairperson may be delegated to exercise some of the chairman's powers by the chairman. In the case that the chairman becomes incapacitated, NPCSC temporarily elects one of the vice chairpersons until the chairman is able to resume their work or a new chairman is elected by the NPC. The position holds reserve constitutional powers under the 1982 revision of the Constitution of the People's Republic of China. As stipulated in Article 84 of the Constitution, should both the president and vice president become incapacitated, and the National People's Congress is unable to elect a timely replacement, the chairman of the NPCSC will act as president.

From 1998 to 2013, the position was ranked second in the hierarchy of the Politburo Standing Committee of the CCP, since Li Peng was barred from seeking a third term as premier in 1998. In the political order of precedence, the chairman ranks below the CCP general secretary and president. The ranking of this position is not necessarily reflective of its actual power, which varies depending on the officeholder. The incumbent chairman is Zhao Leji, who is the third-ranking member of the Politburo Standing Committee.

History 
Initially, there were disagreements to whether name the post "chairman" ( or ) or "speaker". However, ultimately the word "chairman" was adopted. The office came into existence with the adoption of the 1954 Constitution, with Liu Shaoqi becoming its first holder.

From 1975 to 1983, the chairman of the Standing Committee served as head of state of the People's Republic of China, as the presidency had been written out of the 1975 constitution and was also excluded from the 1978 draft. Theoretically, during the 1989 Tiananmen Square protests, the NPC chairman at the time, Wan Li, had the power to call an emergency session of the NPC to resolve the issue constitutionally. However, Wan's freedom of movement was restricted, and ultimately rendered powerless in the situation.

Between 1993 and 1998, the office was held by Qiao Shi, who was the third-ranking member of the Politburo Standing Committee. Qiao tried to get rid off the NPC's "rubber stamp" reputation and turn it into an institution with real power in establishing the rule of law.

On 16 March 1998, Li Peng was elected the chairman of the NPCSC, replacing Qiao Shi. However, he was elected with less than 90% of the vote, with around three hundred delegates not backing him, despite the fact that he was the only candidate.

List of chairpersons 

Multiple terms in office, consecutive or otherwise, are listed and counted in the first column counts individuals and the second column (term number).

 Generations of leadership

Timeline

Further reading

References 

 
China, National People's Congress, Chairman
Members of the Standing Committee of the National People's Congress
1954 establishments in China